Beacon Creek is a stream in the U.S. state of Georgia.

Beacon Creek was so named on account of a nautical beacon at its mouth.

References

Rivers of Georgia (U.S. state)
Rivers of McIntosh County, Georgia